Q&A is an interview series on the C-SPAN network that typically airs every Sunday night. It is hosted by C-SPAN founder Brian Lamb. Its stated purpose is to feature discussions with "interesting people who are making things happen in politics, the media, education, and science & technology in hour-long conversations about their lives and their work."

References

External links

2013
QandA